Guilherme Castro Boulos (born 19 June 1982) is a Brazilian politician, activist and writer. He is a member of the National Coordination of Homeless Workers' Movement (MTST). Boulos joined the Socialism and Liberty Party (PSOL) in 2018, and was PSOL's candidate for the presidency of Brazil in the 2018 general election. 

In 2020 Boulos was the PSOL nominee for mayor of São Paulo in the 2020 election, qualifying for a second round against PSDB candidate Bruno Covas. Covas defeated Boulos in the run-off. In the 2022 elections, Boulos was elected to the Chamber of Deputies from São Paulo, having received the most votes for federal deputy in the state.

As a member of the Homeless Workers' Movement, Boulos became nationally known in 2003, when he participated in an occupation of Volkswagen's land in São Bernardo do Campo. Closely associated with former President Lula da Silva, he has been described as an "heir" to Lula, with his physical likeliness to Lula during his youth being widely noted. He was selected by Time for their Time 100 Next list of emerging leaders worldwide for 2021.

Early life and career 
Guilherme Boulos is the son of Marcos Boulos, a professor of medicine at the University of São Paulo. He is of Lebanese descent, with “Boulos” meaning “Paul” in Arabic. He graduated with a degree in philosophy in 2006 and received a master's degree in mental health in 2017, both from the University of São Paulo. In his youth he engaged in the Union of Communist Youth. He also joined the Homeless Workers' Movement in 2002.

He became famous in 2003 when he participated in the coordination of the invasion of a Volkswagen's ground in São Bernardo do Campo. He appeared again in the press in 2014, in the wake of the social mobilizations around the World Cup, especially the invasion called Occupation People's Cup, organized by the MTST in early May.

Prison 
On 17 January 2017, Boulos was arrested on charges of committing judicial disobedience and incitement to violence during the repossession lawsuit of a land in the district of São Mateus. In the night of the same day, he was released from prison. In his defense, he claims that his detention was arbitrary and for political reasons.

Books

Electoral history

See also 
 2018 Guilherme Boulos presidential campaign

References

External links 

 

|-

Anti-imperialism in South America
Brazilian anti-capitalists
Brazilian activists
Brazilian socialists 
1982 births
Living people
People from São Paulo
Socialism and Liberty Party politicians
University of São Paulo alumni
Candidates for President of Brazil